The Farrenkopf, also known as the "Rigi of the Central Black Forest" is a mountain with extensive views in the Black Forest near the town of Hausach in the Kinzig valley.

Tourism 
The mountain is cross by part of the West Way from Hausach to the Büchereck. Another waymarked ascent runs from Gutach (Schwarzwaldbahn). On the Farrenkopf is the Hasemann Hut, named after artist, Prof. Wilhelm Hasemann.

References

Literature 
 Julius Wais: Schwarzwaldführer, 3rd edn., in Kommission bei A. Bonz’ Erben, Stuttgart, 1913, p. 211
 Landesamt für Geoinformation und Landesentwicklung: Freizeitkarte 1:50,000 Offenburg Ortenau Kinzigtal, 2nd edn. 2009, 

Mountains and hills of Baden-Württemberg
Mountains and hills of the Black Forest
Ortenaukreis